Aniela is a Polish feminine given name, cognate with the Greek-derived name Angela. Anielka is a hypocorism of this name. The name Aniela became popular in the 18th century mainly due to the Ursulines. People with these names include:
Aniela Aszpergerowa (1815–1920), Polish stage actress
Aniela Tułodziecka (1853–1932), Polish educational activist
Aniela Pająkówna (1864–1912), Polish painter who worked in France
Aniela Zagórska (1881–1943), Polish literary translator
Aniela Steinsbergowa (1896–1988), Polish lawyer
Aniela Cukier (1900–1944), Polish painter
Anielka Elter (1901–1958), Czechoslovak film actress
Aniela Pawlikowska (1901–1980), Polish painter who worked in England
Aniela Jaffé (1903–1991), Swiss psychoanalyst
Aniela Kupiec (1920–2019), Polish poet 
Aniela Krzywoń (1925–1943), Polish People's Army soldier
Aniela Nikiel (born 1965), Polish long-distance runner
Aniela Rodríguez (born 1992), Mexican poet and writer

References

Polish feminine given names